The Atomic Energy Act of 1954, 42 U.S.C. §§ 2011-2021, 2022-2286i, 2296a-2297h-13, is a United States federal law that covers for the development, regulation, and disposal of nuclear materials and facilities in the United States.

It was an amendment to the Atomic Energy Act of 1946 and substantially refined certain aspects of the law, including increased support for the possibility of a civilian nuclear industry. Notably it made it possible for the government to allow private companies to gain technical information (Restricted Data) about nuclear energy production and the production of fissile materials, allowing for greater exchange of information with foreign nations as part of President Dwight D. Eisenhower's Atoms for Peace program, and reversed certain provisions in the 1946 law which had made it impossible to patent processes for generating nuclear energy or fissile materials.

The H.R. 9757 legislation was passed by the 83rd U.S. Congressional session and signed into law by President Dwight Eisenhower on August 30, 1954.

The Nuclear Regulatory Commission described the Atomic Energy Act as, "the fundamental U.S. law on both the civilian and the military uses of nuclear materials."

See also
 Arms Control and Disarmament Act of 1961
 Atomic Energy Act
 Bourke B. Hickenlooper
 Nuclear Non-Proliferation Act of 1978

Notes and references

External links
 NRC.gov: The Atomic Energy Act of 1954 – PDF file.
 * "FOREIGN RELATIONS OF THE UNITED STATES, 1952–1954, NATIONAL SECURITY AFFAIRS, VOLUME II, PART 2". Office of the Historian. U.S. Department of State (Washington, D.C.).

1954 in American law
Arms control
Military disbanding and disarmament
Nuclear history of the United States
Nuclear weapons infrastructure of the United States
United States Atomic Energy Commission
United States federal criminal legislation
United States federal energy legislation
83rd United States Congress
1954 in the environment